Catfish Creek (Texas) is a river in Texas. It was designated a National Natural Landmark in 1983.

See also
List of rivers of Texas

References

USGS Hydrologic Unit Map - State of Texas (1974)

Rivers of Texas
Tributaries of the Red River of the South
Rivers of Anderson County, Texas
National Natural Landmarks in Texas